Harton Road railway station was a station in Eaton-under-Heywood, Shropshire, England. The station was opened in 1867 and closed in 1951.

When it originally opened the station was named Harton with the suffix 'Road' added in 1881
There was originally a signal box at the far west end of the platform and this was replaced in 1904 with a ground frame to control the goods loop that could hold seven wagons.
Following the closure of the station the ground frame remained in use as the line was used for wagon storage, This was followed in December 1955 by a reduction in the storage length to half a mile

The station was nearly half a mile from Harton. The station is now a private residence.

References

Further reading

Disused railway stations in Shropshire
Railway stations in Great Britain opened in 1867
Railway stations in Great Britain closed in 1951
Former Great Western Railway stations